Blèves is a commune in the Sarthe department in the region of Pays de la Loire in north-western France. The population of Blèves was 112 in 2018.

See also
 Communes of the Sarthe department

References

Communes of Sarthe